Sandra Lou (born 24 December 1980) is a French radio and television presenter.

Early life and career 
Sandra Lou was born Sandra Benotès in Calais in the department of Pas-de-Calais. She has a younger sister and her parents are separated. Passionated of music, she learned the piano for a few years before creating a band with her friends, in which she was the lead singer. She then began her studies after obtaining her high school final exam in literature (Baccalauréat littéraire).

She later began a modeling career and became recognized in beauty contests. She was elected Miss World France 1999, after being elected Miss Nord-Pas-de-Calais. She represented France at the Miss World in December 1999, where she was ranked number 12 out of 94. In 2000, she was ranked second at the World Miss University contest.

Television career 
She was contacted by M6 to participate at Bachelor, le gentleman célibataire (French version of The Bachelor), where she was eliminated in semi-final. She then played in some films and television series, appearing as well in some advertisements. She was contacted again by M6 to present the weather, and finally became a columnist on channels Fun TV and M6 in the program C'est pas trop tôt.

Sandra Lou co-hosted Génération Hit with Jérôme Anthony, was a replacement in Star Six Music, and also replaced Séverine Ferrer in Fan De, after her lay-off in 2005. Two years later, she was also laid off by M6 and replaced by Karine Ferri. In September 2007, she pursued her career as a presenter on the web with the site plusfortquelatele.com. She later presented Drôle de gags on channel NT1.

Since then, she has presented several programs on channel TMC such as Hell's Kitchen : les cuisines de l'enfer and Incroyable mais vrai ! Le mag since September 2008. She also started presenting at the same time the short program RTL9 Family on channel RTL9. In 2009, during the 34th edition of the Paleo Festival, she presented a daily program of 25 minutes dedicated to the best moments of the festival with Clara Morgane and Séverine Ferrer.

Since 2010, she has presented several programs and specials of Le Grand Bêtisier on TMC. Since October 2012, she presents with Vincent Cerutti and Sandrine Quétier the program Danse avec les stars, la suite on TF1.

Music career 
In 2004, she released the single Le Banana Split, a cover version of the Belgian singer Lio's signature song. The single became a moderate success in France, earning the 36th place on the singles chart.

Personal life 
In 2008, she won the trial for her abusive lay-off by M6 and earned 50,000 euros.

She gave birth to a girl named Lilli on 6 May 2009.

Filmography 
Le Groupe (TV series, 2001)
Même âge, même adresse (TV series, 2003)
Sous le Soleil (TV series, 2008)

Discography 
Le Banana Split (CD Single, 2004)

External links 

 

1980 births
French television presenters
French women television presenters
French radio presenters
French women radio presenters
French television actresses
People from Calais
Living people